Kami Sid is the first Pakistani trans person to rise to prominence as a fashion model. Sid is also an actor and LGBTQ rights activist. Sid also became a controversial figure after accusations of rape and sexual assault against her.

Early life 
Sid was born to a middle-class family in Karachi comprising seven siblings. Sid's father passed away during her adolescence and she was raised by a supportive mother. She has a bachelor's degree in Business Studies. She tried to go to the UK for higher studies, but was unable to get a visa. Among the trans communities in Pakistan, Sid belongs to the Khawaja Sira community.

Professional life, activism, and controversies 
In 2012, Sid travelled to Thailand for their first photoshoot. The exposure as Pakistan's first trans model brought about a lot of backlash.

In November 2016, Sid did a photoshoot as a form of protest against the atrocities committed against transgender people in Pakistan. On the Pakistani Independence Day of 2017, Sid posed on a rooftop in Karachi while holding up the Pakistani flag. She has given a lecture on transphobia and misogyny in the Karachi Literature Festival in London. Sid is a board member of this non-profit organisation called 'Street to School', which teaches sex-ed and cultural diversity to schoolchildren. She is the program coordinator of the Aks International Minorities Festival in Copenhagen, Denmark.

In 2017, Sid made her acting debut in the short film "Rani" as a transgender toy seller who makes her living selling the items on the streets of Karachi. Produced by GrayScale and Rizvilia Productions, the film is directed by Hammad Rizvi.  Of Sid's performance in the film, the Daily Pakistan said that Sid "is a force of nature in it". She was also cast in a play titled 'Dil e Nadan', a play based on a trans person and their relationship with society.

Kami Sid was also accused of rape and sexual assault after which Aurat March organizers removed her from serving as a part of their organizing team in 2018.  Though Kami rejects the allegations but Aurat March organizers issued a statement that Sid intimidated them. Kami Sid's participation in the PR campaign Change The Clap has also been critiqued for appeasing neoliberal forces and ignoring local practices of the Khawaja Sira community.

References

Pakistani models
Transgender female models
Living people
Year of birth missing (living people)
Pakistani LGBT people
Transgender models
Transgender actresses
LGBT models